The Khanqah of Faraj ibn Barquq is a religious Islamic funerary complex built by the Mamluk Sultan Faraj ibn Barquq from 1400 to 1411 CE. It is located in Cairo, Egypt, in the Northern Cemetery which is a part of Cairo's historic necropolis districts. It is often considered one of the most accomplished works of Mamluk architecture in Cairo, and one of the major monuments of the Northern Cemetery district.

Historical background 

Sultan Faraj's monument is considered by many, including Mamluk historians, to be one of the finest buildings of Mamluk architecture in Cairo. Its creation is considered all the more remarkable considering that Faraj's reign was characterized by political unrest, destruction, and economic difficulties. Faraj was unable to prevent devastating incursions by Timur (Tamerlane) into Syria (starting in 1400), and he was deposed briefly in 1405 before regaining the throne. His critics held him responsible for financial mismanagement, which drained the treasury, and for oppressive taxation. He was eventually deposed and assassinated in 1411, at the age of 23.

The creation of this funerary complex was actually ordered by Faraj's father, Sultan Barquq, who expressed a desire to be buried in the desert close to the existing tombs of Islamic saints and scholars, instead of in the urban funerary complex he had built at Bayn al-Qasrayn in central Cairo. Barquq had already allocated a fund of 80,000 dinars for the task, which was carried out by his son and successor. Barquq himself was buried on this site upon his death in 1399, before the building itself was constructed.

The building's location is in what is now known as the Northern Cemetery, one of the historic Cairo necropolises collectively known as the Qarafa. Today the area is dotted with other Mamluk tombs from the Burji period and is filled with other cemeteries as well as modern residential buildings. At the time of the building's construction, however, this area was largely empty and uninhabited (or sparsely inhabited) desert land outside the city. There was nonetheless an important caravan road here which was part of the road to Mecca, which meant that travelers still regularly passed through the area. Faraj's funerary complex, a khanqah with facilities for its residents, was intended to encourage urbanization of this area. Faraj originally intended to establish some marketplaces here and build other facilities, but this process never fully took place, perhaps in part because of his early death. Sultan Qaytbay made a similar attempt nearby with his own funerary complex later that century, which was described as a "royal suburb", but urbanization of the surrounding area never fully occurred until much later.

Construction 
The supervisor of construction is named as amir Lajin al-Turuntay, likely appointed by Faraj, although Barquq had previously appointed amir Yunus al-Dawadar to this role. The timeline of construction is largely known according to official inscriptions found on the building. The northern mausoleum chamber, where Faraj and his father Barquq are buried, has an inscription dating it to 1400-01 (803 AH) and attributing it to Faraj acting on the orders of Barquq. A second inscription there states that it was completed in 1405 by Sultan Abd-al Aziz, another son of Barquq who briefly replaced Faraj as sultan that year. Faraj returned to the throne and eventually completed the building in 1410-1411 (813 AH). The southern mausoleum was the last part to be finished, while the mosque area in between the mausoleums was likely finished earlier. This was a long construction period by Mamluk standards, but the chaos and interruptions of Faraj's reign are most likely the reason for this.

Architecture

Overview and layout 
The complex was designated primarily as a khanqah (a residence and center for Sufis). It is centered around a large central courtyard, surrounded by living quarters to the west and adjoining a prayer hall or mosque section to the east, which in turn is flanked by two large mausoleums on either side. The complex also features two minarets, two sabils (water dispensaries), and two kuttabs (primary schools) in an almost symmetrical arrangement on its western facade. The overall layout is similar to that of a regular congregational mosque, which is indeed a function that the building also served.

The complex has a nearly square floor plan measuring 72 meters by 73 meters. Its broad symmetrical layout is rare in the Mamluk era, as sultans and amirs most frequently built their complexes in the city, where space restrictions required inventive and asymmetrical floor plans in order to accommodate their surroundings. The fact that Faraj's complex was built in the open desert outside the city allowed for this fairly unique monument which makes full use of the space: two mausoleums are spread to either side at the mosque section's eastern corners, and two minarets stand apart from each other above the eastern facade. The placement of the domed mausoleums at these corners made them fully visible to travelers passing along the road, while at the same time making them easily accessible to those praying in the mosque inside. This made it easier for both visitors inside and passers-by outside to offer prayers to the deceased sultan and his family buried here; a consideration which was often important in the placement of Mamluk tombs.

The building has two entrances, one next to each kuttab, though the southwestern one is the most publicly accessible entrance today. The southwestern entrance also presents the only notable asymmetry in the architectural layout; instead of being integrated into the main square floor plan of the building, it projects outwards from the rest of the building and is attached to small square chamber which seemed to have been intended as a reception hall.

The mausoleums and their domes 
The large stone domes of the mausoleums represent an important step in the development of Mamluk architecture and a high point of Mamluk engineering. They are the earliest large domes in Cairo to be made of stone (earlier ones were usually in wood). In fact, they remain the largest stone domes of the Mamluk period in Cairo, with a diameter of 14.3 meters. The northern mausoleum chamber contains the tombs of both Sultan Barquq and Sultan Faraj (ibn Barquq), while the southern mausoleum chamber is dedicated to the tombs of female relatives. Both mausoleum chambers are decorated with marble paneling, their own mihrab (niche indicating the direction of prayer), and a large inscription band along the wall. The dome ceilings are also painted.

The prayer hall 

The mosque area is comparatively plain, but is also characterized by its uncommon stonework. Instead of the usual wooden ceiling found elsewhere in most Mamluk (or Cairene) mosques, the ceiling is composed of stone vaults, with a small higher dome rising right in front of the mihrab. A stone dikka (reading platform) also stands at the edge of the prayer hall.

The minbar is also made of stone and features excellent craftsmanship with carved geometric patterns, though it is a later donation from Sultan Qaytbay in 1483 and reflects the artistic quality of that time.

See also
 Khanqah-Mausoleum of Sultan Barsbay
 Lists of mosques
 List of mosques in Africa
 List of mosques in Egypt
 History of medieval Arabic and Western European domes

References

External links 

 "Khanqah al-Nasir Faraj ibn Barquq" at Archnet (includes historical images and floor plan)
 "Khanqah and Madrasa of Sultan Faraj ibn Barquq" at Discover Islamic Art (Museum With No Frontiers)

Mamluk architecture in Egypt
Mausoleums in Egypt
Mosques in Cairo
Religious buildings and structures with domes